Micaela de Luján (1570–1614), was a Spanish actress. She belonged to the first professional actresses in Spain, being active in the 1590s. She had a relationship with Lope de Vega and is portrayed by him in his work under the name Carmila Lucinda.

References

1570 births
1614 deaths
16th-century Spanish actresses
17th-century Spanish actresses